Nathan Jackson may refer to:

Nathan Jackson (artist) (born 1938), American Tlingit artist
Nate Jackson  (born 1979), American writer and former football player
Nathan Jackson, a character in the TV series The Magnificent Seven

See also
 Nathaniel Jackson (disambiguation)